Barbara Sue Turnbull (February 7, 1965 – May 10, 2015) was a Canadian quadriplegic news reporter and activist for those with physical disabilities. She grew up in Mississauga, Ontario.

Shooting
Late in the evening of September 23, 1983 Turnbull, then an 18-year-old-student at Clarkson Secondary School, was working at her part-time job at a convenience store when 4 Jamaican immigrants (Hugh Logan, Sutcliffe Logan, Warren Johnson and Clive Brown) robbed the establishment. Although she complied with their demands, Hugh Logan shot Barbara in the throat with a .357 Magnum severing her spine, leaving Turnbull paralyzed from the neck down. All 4 young men were arrested, convicted of attempted murder and other offences, and sent to prison.

Two of the offenders had their sentences reduced to armed robbery in 1986. All 4 were jailed and later deported to Jamaica. In Season 4 Episode 5 of the TV series Exhibit A: Secrets of Forensic Science (on Prime), Barbara tells her story in her own words.

Education
In spite of the life-changing tragedy, Turnbull went on to journalism school in the Arizona State University, from 1987 to 1990, where she was the valedictorian of her graduating class.

Journalistic career
Upon returning home to Toronto, Barbara Turnbull was hired by the Toronto Star as a reporter for the Life section of their newspaper. For her part, she would do articles about other people with disabilities that were similar to her own, as well as research into spinal cord injury.

Challenge To Famous Player Theatres
In 1993, she made a complaint with the Ontario Human Rights Commission over lack of accessibility in cinemas operated by Famous Players Theatres; in 2001 the commission ruled in her favour, however two cinemas were closed instead of being made fully accessible.

Illness and death
On Sunday, May 10, 2015, Barbara Turnbull died from complications with pneumonia, at age 50 years. Her funeral was held at Cathedral Church of St. James (Toronto).  She is buried at Mount Pleasant Cemetery, Toronto.

Order of Canada
On Canada Day July 1, 2015, Barbara Turnbull was posthumously called to the Order of Canada, for her journalism and for her dedication to helping to improve the lives of those with quadriplegia.

References

External links

1965 births
2015 deaths
Canadian women journalists
Canadian women non-fiction writers
Deaths from pneumonia in Ontario
Journalists from Ontario
Members of the Order of Canada
People with tetraplegia
Toronto Star people
Writers from Mississauga